De La Salle College in Jersey is a private independent Catholic all-boys school  taking its name from St. John Baptist de La Salle (1651–1719), who founded the De La Salle Brothers in France.

History

De La Salle College takes its name from St. John Baptist de La Salle (1651–1719), who founded the Brothers' Order in the time of Louis XIV. Today the Order has establishments in over 80 countries.

A few Brothers settled in Jersey at the time of the French Revolution and remained on the Island for several years. Then, from 1866 to 1896, a school of up to 300 pupils run by the Brothers' flourished in St. Thomas's Parish. The Brothers left the Island in 1896, but were invited to return in 1917 to found another school.

The school was established at Berry House next to St. Thomas's Church in St. Helier and was initially known as St. Aloysius College. Within a year the main site of the school was moved to a property known as "The Beeches" on Wellington Hill in the parish of St. Saviour. It was at this point that the name De La Salle College was first given to the school.

Under the direction of Brother Edward, the first and longest-serving Headmaster (33 years), the school grew significantly in numbers. On opening day, 1 October 1917, there were just a dozen pupils. By the start of the following year the number had increased to 57 and reached 100 by 1921. In 1933 enrollment topped the 200 mark and a school holiday was given to mark the occasion.

The transfer of the school from the French Province in Quimper to the Province of London in 1948 marked a distinct change in the fortunes of the school. By 1949 no fewer than 470 pupils were attending the school. New buildings were planned and erected in the mid-1950s. Many past pupils testify to the tremendous spirit in the school even at times when it lacked buildings and facilities. Without this spirit, it is difficult to appreciate how the school could have survived.

Two significant factors have helped ensure that the school has a bright future well into the next century. The first was the introduction of the Covenant Scheme. Begun in the mid-1960s, it led initially to the opening of the swimming pool and gymnasium and then to a period of rapid expansion. The 6th Form Block, Science Building, C.D.T. workshops, Art Rooms and the Computer Room were completed in quick succession. Secondly, in 1976, the States of Jersey agreed to provide the school with generous financial assistance in the form of a capitation grant for running costs.

The 6th Form Block, Science Labs and I.T. facilities, Art Rooms, C.D.T. workshops and Drawing office, a new Infant School, six new classrooms for secondary and a new Junior School were all completed thanks to the help provided through the Covenant Scheme.

A “new age” began in the late 1990s when negotiations began with the States of Jersey for capital funding and the building of 8 new classrooms and a library and resources area began in January 2003.

Though there is no longer a Brothers’ Community in Jersey, the school retains close links with the Brothers who are Trustees of the College.

Lasallian Voices
Lasallian Voices is the termly publication of De La Salle College, Jersey. Students can send in stories, poems and other work to be published in the next edition. The most-recent edition was published in the Summer of 2010. However, only the first and second editions have been published online.

Notable alumni

Tim Le Cocq – Deputy Bailiff of Jersey
Terry Le Sueur – Chief Minister of the States of Jersey
Matthew Cook – Spanish international rugby union player

See also
Catholic Church in Jersey
List of schools in Jersey

Bibliography
The Bailiwick of Jersey, G.R. Balleine

References

External links
 

Religious organisations based in Jersey
Schools in Jersey
Secondary schools in the Channel Islands
Jersey
Saint Saviour, Jersey
1917 establishments in the British Empire
Boys' schools in British Overseas Territories and Crown Dependencies
Roman Catholic private schools in the Diocese of Portsmouth